Mary Poppins Opens the Door is a British children's fantasy novel by the Australian-British writer P.L. Travers, the third book and last novel in the Mary Poppins series that features the magical English nanny Mary Poppins. It was published in 1943 by Harcourt, Brace & World, Inc and illustrated by Mary Shepard and Agnes Sims.

Plot summary
On Guy Fawkes Night, Mary Poppins arrives in the wake of the last fireworks display by the Banks family. The Banks children Michael, Jane, the twins, and Annabel plead with her to stay. She reluctantly agrees to do so "till the door opens". When an anxious Jane points out that the nursery door is always opening, she clarifies "the Other Door."

Mrs. Banks has Mary and the children find a piano tuner, who happens to be Mary's cousin, Mr. Twigley. When Mary and the children visit, Mr. Twigley tries to unburden himself from seven wishes given to him when he was born. Besides pianos, Mr. Twigley also specialises in songbirds such as nightingales, one of which he releases when he's finished. He also provides music boxes for Mary and the Banks children to dance to. When they return home later, the drawing room piano is playing perfectly, and when the Banks children ask Mary what happened, she sharply rebukes them.

Other adventures in the book include Mary telling the story of a king (implied to be Old King Cole) who was outsmarted by a cat (known as "The Cat That Looked at a King"), the park statue of Neleus that comes to life for a time during one of their outings, their visit to confectioner Miss Calico and her flying peppermint sticks, an undersea (High-Tide) party where Mary Poppins is the guest of honour, and a party between fairy tale rivals in the Crack between the Old Year and the New. When the children ask why Mary Poppins, a real person, is there, they are told that she is a fairy tale come true. The next morning, Jane and Michael find definite proof of the last night's adventure, and this time she does not deny it, simply telling them that they too may end up living happily ever after.

Finally, after Mary and the children have a nonmagical (but nonetheless wondrous) afternoon playing on the swings at the Park, the citizens of the town as well as many other characters from the previous two books turn out in front of the house to have a farewell party. Before going inside, Mary urges the children to be good and remember everything she told them, and they realise that it is Mary, not the other characters, who is departing. They rush to the nursery to see her open and leave through the nursery door's reflection in the window. Later that evening, Mr. Banks sees a shooting star, and they all wish upon it. The children wish to remember Mary Poppins all their lives, and they faintly make her out in the star. They wave and she waves back to them. The narrator remarks, "Mary Poppins herself had flown away, but the gifts she had brought would remain for always."

Film adaptation
In 2004, Julie Andrews appeared in a live-action/animated 10-minute short film produced by DisneyToon Studios for the 40th Anniversary DVD release of Mary Poppins. The Cat That Looked at a King was based on Mary Poppins Opens the Door, and was the first project offered to The Answer Studio, which included former employees of Walt Disney Animation Japan.

As the film opens, two modern-day British children are looking at chalk drawings at the same location where Dick Van Dyke's character, Bert, did his artwork in the original movie. Andrews (as herself) greets the children and takes them into the chalk drawing where they watch the tale of a cat (Tracey Ullman) that challenges a king (David Ogden Stiers) to a trivia contest. If the cat wins, the king must give up his obsession with facts and figures and reconnect with his queen. Back in the real world—where she, like Poppins, denies that she has been away—Andrews and the cat face each other as the shadow of Mary Poppins is framed by one of the chalk drawings.

The concept of Mary Poppins staying until "the door opens" is used in Mary Poppins Returns.

References

External links
 
 

1943 British novels
1943 fantasy novels
British children's novels
British novels adapted into films
Mary Poppins
1943 children's books
Peter Davies books